The Alternative Bride is a 1925 German silent film directed by Carl Wilhelm and starring Ida Wüst, Bruno Kastner, and Paul Heidemann.

The film's art direction was by Alfred Junge and Fritz Maurischat.

Cast

References

Bibliography

External links

1925 films
Films of the Weimar Republic
Films directed by Carl Wilhelm
German silent feature films
German black-and-white films
Phoebus Film films